Franklin Allen,  (born 6 March 1956) is a British economist and academic. Since 2014, he has been professor of finance and economics, and executive director of the Brevan Howard Centre at Imperial College London. He was the Nippon Life Professor of Finance and Economics at the Wharton School of the University of Pennsylvania. He is most active in the research areas of financial innovations, asset price bubbles, the comparison of financial systems, and financial crises.

Early life and education
He was educated at Merchant Taylors' School, Northwood and Norwich City College. He graduated from the University of East Anglia with a first class bachelor's degree in 1977 and completed his doctorate in economics at Nuffield College, Oxford in 1980.

Academic career
Allen was associate professor of finance and associate professor of finance and economics at the Wharton School from 1980 to 1990, when he became vice dean and director of the Wharton Doctoral Programs and Professor of Finance and Economics. In 1994 he was assigned to the chair of Nippon Life Professor of Finance and Economics as professor. Additionally, he took the position of co-director of the Wharton Financial Institutions Center. He has also visited diverse universities and research centres in the context of visiting professorships, academic fellowships and scientific advisory such as the University of Tokyo (1993), the Johann Wolfgang Goethe-Universität of Francfort (2001, 2006), the Indian School of Business in Hyderabad (2005), the Stockholm School of Economics and Gothenburg University in Sweden (2006).

He is a past president of the American Finance Association, Western Finance Association and the Society for Financial Studies, as well as a scientific adviser at the Sveriges Riksbank, the central bank of Sweden.  He is the editor of the European Finance Association's flagship journal, the Review of Finance. Besides, he acts as advisor to Fair Observer, an online magazine covering global issues from a plurality of perspectives, on issues concerning finance or economics, but also on future strategy and editorial policy.

Together with Stewart Myers and Richard Brealey, he is the author of Principles of Corporate Finance. The work is a widely prescribed, standard textbook for undergraduate students in corporate finance, and also addresses the needs of practising financial managers.

Honours
In July 2017, Allen was elected a Fellow of the British Academy (FBA), the United Kingdom's national academy for the humanities and social sciences.

References

External links
 Wharton School Official Curriculum Vitae

Living people
1956 births
People educated at Merchant Taylors' School, Northwood
21st-century British economists
20th-century British economists
Alumni of the University of East Anglia
Alumni of Nuffield College, Oxford
University of Pennsylvania faculty
Financial economists
American finance and investment writers
American textbook writers
American male non-fiction writers
Corporate finance theorists
Wharton School of the University of Pennsylvania faculty
Fellows of the Econometric Society
Nippon Life
Fellows of the British Academy
People educated at City College Norwich
Presidents of the American Finance Association
The Review of Financial Studies editors